Samuel Benedict Perlozzo (born March 4, 1951) is a former second baseman and manager in Major League Baseball, most recently with the Baltimore Orioles.

Biography
After graduating from Bishop Walsh School in Cumberland, Maryland, Perlozzo was drafted by the Twins after playing college ball at George Washington University. His professional baseball career included parts of two seasons as a reserve with the Minnesota Twins and San Diego Padres, along with one season with the Yakult Swallows in 1980.

Going into the last game of the 1977 season Perlozzo's teammate, Rod Carew, had 99 RBIs. Perlozzo started the game at shortstop in place of Roy Smalley, and just as Perlozzo was about to bat for the first time in the game, manager Gene Mauch grabbed him by the arm and said, "I want you to go up there and hit a triple, right now, this at-bat. You hit a triple, understand?"  Perlozzo did hit a triple, and Carew hit a single to gain his 100th RBI of the season.

With the Orioles, he was promoted from bench coach to interim manager after manager Lee Mazzilli was fired on August 4, 2005, during the team's worst losing streak of the season. The Orioles went 23–32 under Perlozzo that season. On October 12, the "interim" title was dropped as Perlozzo was named the team's manager. In 2006, Perlozzo's first full season as manager of the Orioles, the team finished with a 70–92 record.

Orioles owner Peter Angelos fired Perlozzo as the team's manager on June 18, 2007. Perlozzo was replaced by bullpen coach Dave Trembley on an interim basis then, after some success, had the interim tag removed.

On November 5, 2007, the Seattle Mariners announced that Perlozzo had been hired as their third base coach.

In 2009, Perlozzo was hired by the Philadelphia Phillies to be the team's third base coach. He was moved to first base coach for the 2011 season after former Orioles manager Juan Samuel joined the Phillies staff as third base coach. On October 3, 2012, Perlozzo was dismissed by the Phillies.

Managerial record

See also

References

External links

1951 births
Living people
Baseball coaches from Maryland
American expatriate baseball players in Japan
Baltimore Orioles coaches
Baltimore Orioles managers
Baseball players from Maryland
Cincinnati Reds coaches
Dubuque Packers players
Fort Lauderdale Yankees players
George Washington Colonials baseball players
George Washington University alumni
Hawaii Islanders players
Major League Baseball bench coaches
Major League Baseball second basemen
Major League Baseball third base coaches
New York Mets coaches
Norfolk Tides managers
Orlando Twins players
Philadelphia Phillies coaches
Reno Silver Sox players
San Diego Padres players
Seattle Mariners coaches
Sportspeople from Cumberland, Maryland
Tacoma Twins players
Tidewater Tides players
Toledo Mud Hens players
Yakult Swallows players